The Grand Bay Elementary School for Colored, also known simply as the Grand Bay School, was a racially segregated elementary school located midway between Grand Bay, Alabama and St. Elmo, Alabama along U.S. Route 90. The school was established in 1919 with support from the residents of the surrounding community of Fernland and funding from the Julius Rosenwald Fund. It was constructed on land donated for that purpose by Peter Alba, a Confederate veteran of the Civil War, who lived at Bayou La Batre, Alabama. Of the thousands of schools constructed by the Rosenwald Fund, this school was the eleventh school so funded.  All that remains of the original school is a  piece of stone and mortar.

See also
Julius Rosenwald
Rosenwald School

References

Historically black schools
Educational institutions established in 1919
Rosenwald schools in Alabama
Demolished buildings and structures in Alabama
Buildings and structures in Mobile County, Alabama
Historically segregated African-American schools in Alabama
1919 establishments in Alabama